Michurinsky may refer to:
Michurinsky District, a district of Tambov Oblast, Russia
Michurinsky Selsoviet, Khabarsky District, Altai Krai, a selsoviet of Khabarsky District of Altai Krai, Russia
Michurinsky (rural locality) (Michurinskaya, Michurinskoye), several rural localities in Russia

See also
Michurinsk, a town in Tambov Oblast, Russia
Michurin (disambiguation)